Flames for All is the third album from Fatso Jetson, released on the legendary Man's Ruin Records.  This is the only album to feature their short lived four-piece lineup featuring Gary Arce of Yawning Man.

Track listing

Personnel
Mario Lalli – guitar, vocals
Larry Lalli – bass
Gary Arce – guitar
Tony Tornay – drums
Steve Feldman – drums (Track 7)

Credits
Recorded and Mixed by Steve Feldman at Monkey Studios, Palm Springs, California

Mastered at Future Disc, Hollywood, California

References 

Fatso Jetson albums
1999 albums
Man's Ruin Records albums